The South Australian Government Gazette is the government gazette of the South Australian Government.

The South Australian Gazette was first printed on 20 June 1839, after the South Australian Government chose to have its own publication rather than using the local newspaper, South Australian Gazette and Colonial Register, because the publishers were perceived as politically biased.  The purpose was to publish government orders and acts with authority of the colonial secretary. Its name was later changed to South Australian Government Gazette  from 12 November 1840.

References

External links
PDF images of the gazette from 1839 to 1999 - 
PDF images and .DOC formats from 1999 till present - 

Government gazettes of Australia
Publications established in 1839
Government of South Australia